Liergues is a former commune in the Rhône department in eastern France. On 1 January 2017, it was merged into the new commune Porte des Pierres Dorées. Its population was 2,185 in 2019.

Geography 
The commune is crossed from south to north by the Merloup (or Merloux) which has its source in Theizé and flows into the Morgon, a tributary of the Saône (and therefore sub-tributary of the Rhône) at Gleizé.

Places and monuments 
Saint-Éloi church.
Château de l'Éclair.
 The cooperative wine cellar of 1929.
Foundation of the Covenant.

Personalities linked to the municipality

See also
Communes of the Rhône department
Porte des Pierres Dorées
Rhône-Alpes

References

Former communes of Rhône (department)